This is a list of baronetcies in the Baronetage of England. The first Baronetage was created in 1611. The Baronetage of England was replaced by the Baronetage of Great Britain in 1707.

This list is not currently complete. For a more complete list, click here.

A

B

C

D

E

F

G

H

I

J

K

L

M

N

O

P

R

S

T

V

W

Y

See also
List of extant Baronetcies
List of baronetcies in the Baronetage of Ireland
List of baronetcies in the Baronetage of Nova Scotia
List of baronetcies in the Baronetage of the United Kingdom
List of baronetcies in the Baronetage of Great Britain

References

External links
Baronetcies to which no Succession has been proved

England

Lists of English people